The Grand Trunk Railway was a railway system that operated in the Canadian provinces of Quebec and Ontario and in the American states of Connecticut, Maine, Michigan, Massachusetts, New Hampshire, and Vermont. The railway was operated from headquarters in Montreal, Quebec, with corporate headquarters in London, United Kingdom (4 Warwick House Street). It cost an estimated $160 million to build. The Grand Trunk, its subsidiaries, and the Canadian Government Railways were precursors of today's Canadian National Railway.

GTR's main line ran from Portland, Maine to Montreal, and then from Montreal to Sarnia, Ontario, where it joined its western subsidiary.

The GTR had four important subsidiaries during its lifetime:
Grand Trunk Eastern which operated in Quebec, Vermont, New Hampshire and Maine.
Central Vermont Railway which operated in Quebec, Vermont, Massachusetts, and Connecticut.
Grand Trunk Pacific Railway which operated in Northwestern Ontario, Manitoba, Saskatchewan, Alberta, and British Columbia.
Grand Trunk Western Railroad which operated in Michigan, Indiana, and Illinois.

A fifth subsidiary was the never-completed Southern New England Railway, chartered in 1910, which would have run from a connection with the Central Vermont at Palmer, Massachusetts, to the deep-water, all-weather port of Providence, Rhode Island. A new line to Providence would have allowed for more extensive port facilities than were possible for the Central Vermont at New London, Connecticut. Construction began in 1910 and continued in fits and starts for more than 20 years until finally abandoned in the early 1930s because of the Great Depression. Another important factor was the unrelenting opposition of the New York, New Haven and Hartford Railroad, which fiercely protected its virtual monopoly control of rail traffic in southern New England.

History

Charter, construction, and expansion

The company was incorporated on November 10, 1852, as the Grand Trunk Railway Company of Canada to build a railway line between Montreal and Toronto.

The charter was soon extended east to Portland, Maine and west to Sarnia, Canada West. In 1853 the GTR purchased the St. Lawrence and Atlantic Railroad from Montreal to the Canada East – Vermont border, and the parent company Atlantic and St. Lawrence Railroad through to the harbour facilities at Portland. A line was also built to Lévis, via Richmond from Montreal in 1855, part of the much-talked about "Maritime connection" in British North America. In the same year it purchased the Toronto and Guelph Railroad, whose railway was already under construction. But the Grand Trunk Railway Company changed the original route of the T&G and extended the line to Sarnia, a hub for Chicago-bound traffic. By July, 1856, the section from Sarnia to Toronto opened, and the section from Montreal to Toronto opened in October of that year. By 1859 a ferry service was established across the St. Clair River to Fort Gratiot (now Port Huron, Michigan).

The Grand Trunk was one of the main factors that pushed British North America towards Confederation.  The original colonial economy structured along the water route from the Maritimes up the St. Lawrence River and the lower Great Lakes was greatly expanded by the duplicate route of the Grand Trunk.  The explosive growth in trade during the 1850s within the United Province of Canada and further east by water to the Maritimes demanded that a railway link the entire geopolitical region together.  During this time the GTR extended its line to Lévis further east to Rivière-du-Loup.

By 1860, the Grand Trunk was on the verge of bankruptcy and in no position to expand further east to Halifax. On the eve of the American Civil War, it stretched from Sarnia in the west to Rivière-du-Loup in the east and Portland in the southeast. Colonists in the United Province of Canada, some who experienced their territory being attacked by the United States fifty years earlier (in the War of 1812), were uncomfortably close to the giant Union Army and faced terrorist attacks during the mid-19th century in the form of Fenian raids.

Such security concerns led to demands for a year-round transportation system that British reinforcements could use should their territory be attacked during winter when the St. Lawrence River was frozen, and the only railway for British reinforcements to use would be the Grand Trunk connection at Portland, in the United States. Many citizens thought that the only way to finish the Grand Trunk – and protect the country – would be to unite all the colonies into a federation so that they could share the costs of an expanded railway system.  Thus the British North America Act, 1867 included the provision for an Intercolonial Railway to link with the Grand Trunk at Rivière-du-Loup.

The end of the American Civil War saw British North America on the verge of uniting in a single federation, and the GTR's financial prospects improved as the railway was well-positioned to take advantage of increased population and economic growth. By 1880, the Grand Trunk Railway system stretched all the way from Portland in the east to Chicago, Illinois, in the west (by means of the Grand Trunk Western Railroad between Port Huron and Chicago).

Several impressive construction feats were associated with the GTR: the first successful bridging of the St. Lawrence River on August 25, 1860, with the opening of the first Victoria Bridge at Montreal (replaced by the present structure in 1898); the bridging of the Niagara River between Fort Erie, Ontario and Buffalo, New York; and the construction of a tunnel beneath the St. Clair River, connecting Sarnia, Ontario, and Port Huron, Michigan.  The latter work opened in August 1890 and replaced the railcar ferry at the same location.

Heyday
To overcome the gauge difference, the GTR experimented with a form of variable-gauge axles called "adjustable gauge trucks", but these proved unreliable.

The GTR system expanded throughout southern Ontario, western Quebec, and the U.S. state of Michigan over the years by purchasing and absorbing numerous smaller railway companies, as well as building new lines. GTR's largest purchase came on August 12, 1882, when it bought the  Great Western Railway, running from Niagara Falls to Toronto, and connecting to London, Windsor, and communities in the Bruce Peninsula.

The company sold the line along the St. Lawrence River between Rivière-du-Loup and Lévis in 1879 to the federal government-owned Intercolonial Railway (IRC), and granted running rights in 1889 to the IRC on trackage between Lévis and Montreal (via Richmond); however, the IRC's construction of a more direct line from Lévis to Saint-Hyacinthe in 1899 saw most of this traffic transferred to that line.

Bankruptcy and nationalization
As the dominant railway in British North America, GTR was reportedly asked by the federal government soon after Confederation to consider building a rail line to the Pacific coast at British Columbia but refused, forcing the government to enact legislation creating the Canadian Pacific Railway (CPR) to meet British Columbia's conditions for joining Confederation. By the early 20th century, GTR desired to operate in Western Canada, particularly given the virtual monopoly of service that CPR maintained and the lucrative increasing flows of immigrants west of Ontario. The federal government encouraged GTR to co-operate with a local railway company operating on the Prairies, the Canadian Northern Railway (CNoR), but an agreement was never reached.

CNoR decided to build its own transcontinental system at this time, forcing GTR in 1903 to enter into an agreement with Wilfrid Laurier's government to build a third railway system from the Atlantic to the Pacific. GTR would build (with federal assistance) and operate the Grand Trunk Pacific Railway (GTPR) from Winnipeg, Manitoba to Prince Rupert, British Columbia, while the government would build and own the National Transcontinental Railway (NTR) from Winnipeg to Moncton, New Brunswick via Quebec City, which the GTR would also operate.

As part of this program, the federal government encouraged the GTR to purchase the Canada Atlantic Railway (CAR) with lines southeast from Ottawa to Vermont, and west from Ottawa to Georgian Bay. The GTR took effective control of the CAR in 1905, although the purchase was not ratified by Parliament until 1914.

The routing of these systems was extremely speculative, as GTPR's main line was located farther north than the profitable CPR main line in the Prairies, and NTR was located even farther north of populous centres in Ontario and Quebec. Construction costs on the GTPR escalated, despite having the most favourable crossing of the Continental Divide in North America at Yellowhead Pass. GTR's cost-conscious president Charles Melville Hays was one of the victims on board RMS Titanic on April 15, 1912. His death is speculated to have contributed to poor management of GTR over the ensuing decade, and also contributed to the abandonment of the uncompleted Southern New England Railway to Providence, Rhode Island, begun in 1910.

Construction started on the GTPR/NTR in 1905, and the GTPR opened to traffic in 1914, followed by the NTR in 1915. It was a transcontinental system, with the only exception being the NTR's ill-fated Quebec Bridge, which would not be completed for several more years.

The first indication the arrangement with the government was faltering came when GTR refused to operate the NTR, citing economic reasons. With the enormous cost of building the GTPR and the limited financial returns being realized, GTR defaulted on loan payments to the federal government in 1919. GTPR was nationalized on March 7 of that year, being operated under a federal government Board of Management until finally being placed under the control of the Crown corporation Canadian National Railways (CNR) on July 20, 1920.

GTR underwent serious financial difficulties as a result of the GTPR, and its shareholders, primarily in the United Kingdom, were determined to prevent the company from being nationalized as well. Eventually on July 12, 1920, GTR was placed under control of another federal government Board of Management while legal battles continued for several more years. Finally, on January 20, 1923, GTR was fully absorbed into the CNR on a date when all constituent companies were merged into the Crown corporation.

Accident

Canada's worst railway accident based on loss of life happened on the GTR, occurring on June 29, 1864, when a passenger train operating between Lévis and Montreal missed a signal for an open drawbridge on the Richelieu River near the present-day town of Mont-Saint-Hilaire, Quebec, plunging onto a passing barge and killing 99 German immigrants.

Legacy

Canadian Rail speculated in 1963 that an independent GTR might have survived had it always used standard gauge. The GTR was a private company headquartered in England that received heavy Canadian government subsidies and was never profitable because of competition from shipping and American railways. (In 1880 40% of the Grand Trunk traffic was from one or another American city to and from Chicago, taking a shortcut across Ontario.) Inflated construction costs, overestimated revenues, and an inadequate initial capitalization threatened bankruptcy for the Grand Trunk.

Sir Joseph Hickson was a key executive from 1874 to 1890 based in Montreal who kept it afloat financially and formed an alliance with the Conservative party. Carlos and Lewis (1995) show that it managed to survive because its British investors accurately assessed the corporation's value and prospects, which included the likelihood that the Canadian government would bail out the railway should it ever default on its bonds. The government had guaranteed a very large loan and had enacted legislation authorizing debt restructuring. These arrangements allowed the company to float new bond issues to replace existing debt and to issue securities in lieu of interest.

American executive Charles Melville Hays (1856-1912) joined the Grand Trunk in 1895 as general manager (and in 1909, president, based in Montreal). Hays was the architect of the great expansion during a colourful and free-spending era. He upgraded the tracks, bridges, shops and rolling stock, but was best known for building huge grain elevators and elaborate tourist hotels such as the Château Laurier in Ottawa. The government built and the Grand Trunk was to operate the National Transcontinental to link the main Grand Trunk with its Pacific subsidiary. The very expensive subsidiary was far north of major population centres and had too little traffic.

Nearing bankruptcy in 1919, the entire system was nationalized: the government merged the Grand Trunk, the Grand Trunk Pacific, and the National Transcontinental lines into the new Canadian National Railways. The process was completed in 1923. The Grand Trunk lines in the United States, however, kept their distinctive name.

The Grand Trunk legacy seeped into late 20th century popular culture, when a hard rock trio from Flint, Michigan, called itself Grand Funk Railroad in 1969.

GTR hotels

Like the CPR and CNR, the GTR began building and operating hotels during the first two decades of the 20th century. Most of the hotels survived the takeover of the GTR by CNR in 1923 and were operated by Canadian National Hotels:
Château Laurier (Ottawa) 1912-1923 - acquired by Canadian National Hotels and later by Canadian Pacific Hotels; now part of the Fairmont Hotels and Resorts chain
Hotel Macdonald (Edmonton) 1912-1923 - acquired by Canadian National Hotels and later by Canadian Pacific Hotels; now part of the Fairmont Hotels and Resorts chain
Fort Garry Hotel (Winnipeg) 1913-1923 - acquired by Canadian National Hotels and now independently operated
Highland Inn (Algonquin Park) 1905–1923; sold to Government of Ontario and demolished

Grand Trunk today

Grand Trunk Railway was built fully a century before major property and highway development took place in the various jurisdictions it crossed and as such had the choice of geography in selecting the most direct routes. As a result, significant sections of GTR mainlines in Canada and Grand Trunk Western routes in the U.S. are still in active use by Canadian National (CN) today, particularly the Quebec City – Chicago corridor by way of Drummondville, Montreal, Kingston, Toronto, London, Sarnia/Port Huron, and Battle Creek.

Following deregulation of the railway industry in Canada and the United States, CN has abandoned or sold many former GTR and GTW branch lines in recent decades, including the former Portland-Montreal main line which had instigated the development of the system to a large degree. As well, a part of the original Toronto–Sarnia routing via St. Mary's Junction and Forest to Point Edward, Ontario, was sold or abandoned, using the Great Western Railway routing instead.

Grand Trunk Corporation

CN continues to use the "Grand Trunk" name for its holding company the Grand Trunk Corporation. The corporation was created in 1971 to provide autonomy in operation for CN's US subsidiaries: Grand Trunk Western Railroad;  Duluth, Winnipeg & Pacific Railway; and the Central Vermont Railway. The main goal of the corporation, headquartered in Detroit, was to make GTW profitable and keep parent CN from having to subsidize GTW's losses. CN sold off the Central Vermont in 1995 when CN became a public traded company instead of a crown corporation.

CN continued to place its US acquisitions as subsidiaries under the Grand Trunk Corporation which includes Illinois Central, Wisconsin Central, and Great Lakes Transportation. The Association of American Railroads considers the Grand Trunk Corporation as a Class I railroad.

The Portland, Maine-Chicago, Illinois mainline of the Grand Trunk is or was known by the following names:
CN Berlin Subdivision, Portland to Island Pond
CN Sherbrooke Subdivision, Island Pond to Saint-Hyacinthe
CN Saint-Hyacinthe Subdivision, Saint-Hyacinthe to Montreal
CN Montreal Subdivision, Montreal to Dorval
CN Kingston Subdivision, Dorval to Toronto
CN Weston Subdivision, Toronto to Brampton
CN Halton Subdivision, Brampton to Georgetown
CN Guelph Subdivision, Georgetown to St. Marys
CN Forest Subdivision, St. Marys to Sarnia (St. Clair Tunnel)
GTW Flint Subdivision, Port Huron (St. Clair Tunnel) to Battle Creek
GTW Southbend Subdivision, Battle Creek to Chicago

The Montreal-Toronto segment had been known by the following names:
CNR Cornwall Subdivision, Dorval to Brockville
CNR Gananoque Subdivision, Brockville to Belleville
CNR Oshawa Subdivision, Belleville to Toronto

The Grand Trunk Railway Building on Warwick House Street in London continues to stand. Built by Aston Webb, the 7 storey building was built in 1907 with the banner The Grand Trunk Railway of Canada on 4 Warwick House Street and Canadian National Railway on Cockspur Street. CN no longer owns the building. The current tenant on the lower floor is The Original London Tour Centre at 17–19 Cockspur Street.

In popular culture

In Series 3, Episode 1 of Downton Abbey, which takes place during the spring of 1920, Robert Crawley, Earl of Grantham learns that he has lost most of the fortune that he received from his wife Cora, which Lord Grantham had largely invested in Grand Trunk Railway stock.

The 1970s American rock band Grand Funk Railroad derived their name from the Grand Trunk Railway, whose lines passed through their hometown of Flint, Michigan.

See also

 Grand Funk Railroad
 Canada Atlantic Railway
 Guelph Junction Railway
 Pontiac Pacific Junction Railway
 List of defunct railroads of North America
 Edson Joseph Chamberlin, president
 Joseph Hobson, chief engineer from 1896
 History of rail transport in Canada

Footnotes

Bibliography

 
 
 
 
 
 .

Primary sources

 Canada. Legislature. Legislative Assembly. Special Committee on the Condition, Management and Prospects of the Grand Trunk. Report 1857, 263 pages online

External links

Collections Canada: History of the Grand Trunk Railway
Grand Trunk Railway Engineer Department: Road section foreman's wage and material book for years 1866-1874 (Trent University Archives)
GTR History
Grand Trunk Railway Collection Finding Aid, Special Collections, University of Vermont Library
Scans of the prospectus documents circulated by Barings in 1853
Maps of the Grand Trunk Railway 1857, and its connections, c1860
Report for submission to the shareholders of the Grand Trunk Railway in 1860
, illustrated account of the Grand Trunk Railway

 
Defunct Ontario railways
Defunct Quebec railways
Defunct Maine railroads
Defunct New Hampshire railroads
Defunct Vermont railroads
History of Montreal
Predecessors of the Canadian National Railway
Railway companies established in 1852
Railway companies disestablished in 1923
5 ft 6 in gauge railways in the United States
Defunct New York (state) railroads
Defunct Michigan railroads
5 ft 6 in gauge railways in Canada
Canadian companies established in 1852
Transport companies based in London
Defunct companies based in London
Companies based in the City of Westminster